WITB-LP (107.1 FM) is a radio station licensed to Benton, Kentucky, United States.  The station is currently owned by Benton Church of Christ, Inc.

References

External links
 

ITB-LP
ITB-LP